Irvine "Isidore" Perel (1872 – 23 October 1928) was a member of the Queensland Legislative Council.

Perel was born in Ararat, Victoria, to Louis Perel and his wife  Elizabeth (née Brand). He was educated in  Ararat and worked as an electrician for the PMG in Bundaberg and Townsville. Perel was also editor of the Patriot newspaper in Bundaberg, transferring it to Brisbane in 1893.

Political career
When the Labour Party starting forming governments in Queensland, it found much of its legislation being blocked by a hostile Council, where members had been appointed for life by successive conservative governments. After a failed referendum in May 1917, Premier Ryan tried a new tactic, and later that year advised the Governor, Sir Hamilton John Goold-Adams, to appoint thirteen new members whose allegiance lay with Labour to the Council.

Perel was one of the thirteen new members, and went on to serve for four and a half years until the Council was abolished in March, 1922.

Personal life
Perel was married twice, firstly to Amy Anna Brooks in 1892, then in 1901 to Henrietta Mary Hurford (d.1968)  with his second marriage producing 4 sons and three daughters. He died at his Albion home in October 1928 and was buried in Toowong Cemetery.

References

Members of the Queensland Legislative Council
1872 births
1928 deaths
Australian Labor Party members of the Parliament of Queensland
Burials at Toowong Cemetery
People from Ararat, Victoria